KSPT (1400 AM) is a radio station broadcasting a news talk information format, licensed to Sandpoint, Idaho, United States. The station is currently owned by Blue Sky Broadcasting Inc. and features programming from ABC Radio and Premiere Radio Networks.

KSPT shares studios and offices with its sister stations at 327 Marion Avenue in Sandpoint.

References

External links

SPT
News and talk radio stations in the United States